Cambaro can refer to the following places in the Philippines:

 Cambaro, Mandaue, a barangay in the city of Mandaue
 Cambaro, a barangay in the municipality of Macrohon, Southern Leyte